Arthur Ernst Becher (July 7, 1877 – November 4, 1960) was an American Illustrator.

Background
Becher was born in Germany and emigrated to Milwaukee, Wisconsin at the age of eight. He joined Milwaukee Art Student's League and sketched at Jones Island with Louis Mayer and other artists. In 1899, he moved with William Aylward to Wilmington, Delaware. For a couple of years starting in 1902 he studied under illustrator Howard Pyle.

Becher practiced photography during this period, and in 1902 he participated in the first exhibition of the Photo-Secession, a group of pictorialist photographers selected by Alfred Stieglitz. In 1904, he married Freida L. Knappe and moved to Ardsley, New York.  Freida was frequently a model for his book and magazine illustrations.
  
In 1908, Appleton's Magazine sent Becher to London where he sketched the Elgin Marbles at the British Museum. While in Europe he took the opportunity to study oil painting with the German artist Otto Leopold Strutzel.

Becher's career spanned 40 years, during which he illustrated for many of the leading magazines of the day including Collier's Weekly, McCall's, Ladies' Home Journal, Scribner's Magazine and Pictorial Review. He used drawing media such as carbon or charcoal pencil for many of his illustrations but also worked in large scale oil painting. He sometimes painted landscapes. Many of his works had allegorical themes.

In 1959, the common council of Milwaukee purchased some of Becher's work depicting Jones Island for $1,800.

Becher died on November 4, 1960, in Poughkeepsie, New York.

Gallery

Notes

External links
 
 
 Arthur E. Becher at AskArt.com
 

1877 births
1960 deaths
American illustrators
German emigrants to the United States
Artists from Milwaukee
People from Wilmington, Delaware
People from Ardsley, New York